The Peterkin Papers is a collection of humorous short stories by American author Lucretia Peabody Hale. The book was first published in 1880, and a sequel, The Last of the Peterkins was printed in 1886.

Story publication history
The first Peterkin story, The Lady Who Put Salt in Her Coffee, was published in the April 1868 issue of the children’s magazine Our Young Folks. Other stories in the series originally appeared in issues of Our Young Folks, until the  periodical ceased publication in 1873. Later Peterkin stories were published in ''St. Nicholas Magazine’’.

Snyopsis
The family consisted of Mr. and Mrs. Peterkin and their children Elizabeth Eliza, Soloman John, Agamemnon, plus three unnamed little boys. They lived near Boston, and encountered difficulties due to their "scatterbrained naivete and were rescued from disaster in each case by the commonsensical Lady from Philadelphia."  The author based the Lady from Philadelphia on her friend, Susan Lyman Lesley.

References

External links

The Peterkin Papers at "A Celebration of Women Writers", University of Pennsylvania
1924 edition, via archive.org
 

1880 short story collections
American short story collections
Works originally published in St. Nicholas Magazine
Children's short story collections
American children's books
1880s children's books